Selenite refers to the anion with the chemical formula . It is the oxyanion of selenium. It is the selenium analog of the sulfite ion, . Thus selenite is pyramidal and selenium is assigned oxidation state +4. Selenite also refers to compounds that contains this ion, for example sodium selenite  which is a common source of selenite. Selenite also refers to the esters of selenous acid, for example dimethyl selenite .

Synthesis and reactions
Selenite salts can be prepared by neutralizing solutions of selenous acid, which is generated by dissolving selenium dioxide in water. The process proceeds via the hydrogenselenite ion, .

Selenite reacts with elemental sulfur to form thioselenate:

Most selenite salts can be formed by heating the metal oxide with selenium dioxide, e.g.:

References

 
Selenium(IV) compounds